Zarema is a given name. Notable people with the surname include:

Zarema, Crimean-American singer, songwriter, and actress
Zarema Kasayeva (born 1987), Russian weightlifter
Zarema Muzhakhoyeva (born 1980), Ingush woman
Zarema Sadulayeva (1974–2009), Russian children's activist